Season's Beatings is a French comedy-drama film directed by Danièle Thompson, released in 1999.

Plot
Following the recent death of her second husband, for Christmas, Yvette tries to meet the three daughters from her first marriage with Stanislas, the gypsy violinist, again. During the preparations, questions and revelations are well underway from Louba, the artist, Sonia, the middle child and Milla, the rebel.

Yvette and Stanislas' daughters dreaded celebrating Christmas festivities because it coincides with the couple's 25th wedding anniversary. Ever since Yvette's divorce from Stanislas, and her remarriage, the siblings have had a strained relationship with their mother.

Yvette and her daughters had an emotional reunion and reconciliation following the tragedy that took the life of her second husband.

Cast
 Sabine Azéma as Louba
 Emmanuelle Béart as Sonia
 Charlotte Gainsbourg as Milla
 Claude Rich as Stanislas
 Françoise Fabian as Yvette
 Jean-Pierre Darroussin as Gilbert
 Isabelle Carré as Annabelle
 Samuel Labarthe as Pierre
 Françoise Brion as Janine
 Christopher Thompson as Joseph
 Hélène Fillières as Véronique
 Marie de Villepin as Marie

Critical response
On Metacritic the film has a score of 66 out of 100, based on 15 critics, indicating "generally favorable reviews".

Accolades

See also
 List of Christmas films

References

External links
 
 

1999 films
1990s Christmas comedy-drama films
French Christmas comedy-drama films
1990s French-language films
StudioCanal films
Films directed by Danièle Thompson
Films featuring a Best Supporting Actress César Award-winning performance
Films scored by Michel Legrand
1999 directorial debut films
1990s French films